Joshua Kulp (born July 16, 1970) is an American-Israeli Talmudic scholar.

Early life and education 

Kulp was born on July 16, 1970, in the United States and grew up in Margate, New Jersey.  He earned his undergraduate degree at the University of Michigan and his PhD in Talmud at Bar-Ilan University.

Career 
Kulp is especially known for his commentary on the Haggadah.

Kulp was one of the founders of the Conservative Yeshiva, where he is  a member of the faculty and rosh yeshiva. He also teaches at the Schechter Institute of Jewish Studies and coordinates the Mishnah Yomit project through the United Synagogue of Conservative Judaism, the congregational organization for Conservative Judaism, in both North America and the world.

Personal life 
He has two daughters and two sons and lived in Modi'in as of 2009.

Books

 The Schechter Haggadah, 2009
 Reconstructing the Talmud, Mechon Hadar, 2014

References

Living people
1970 births
20th-century American rabbis
21st-century American rabbis
Bar-Ilan University alumni
Israeli Conservative rabbis
People from Margate City, New Jersey
American emigrants to Israel
Israeli people of American-Jewish descent
American Conservative rabbis
People from Modi'in-Maccabim-Re'ut
Conservative rosh yeshivas